Lukas Uleckas (born 6 August 1999) is a Lithuanian professional basketball player for Rytas Vilnius of the Lithuanian Basketball League (LKL). Uleckas has competed with the Lithuanian junior national teams on multiple occasions.

Early career

Uleckas began his career in 2015, playing for Sabonis Basketball Center of the RKL. In July 2016, he signed a long-term deal with Žalgiris Kaunas. He then joined Žalgiris-2 Kaunas of the NKL, where he played for three seasons.

Professional career
Uleckas made his professional debut with Žalgiris' senior team on October 14, 2018, in an LKL regular season home game against BC Neptūnas.

References

External links
 Lukas Uleckas at Eurobasket.com
 Lukas Uleckas at Euroleague.net
 Lukas Uleckas at RealGM.com

1999 births
Living people
BC Prienai players
BC Rytas players
BC Žalgiris players
BC Žalgiris-2 players
Lithuanian men's basketball players
Shooting guards
Small forwards
Sportspeople from Marijampolė